Henry James O'Brien Bedford-Jones (April 29, 1887 – May 6, 1949) was a Canadian-American historical, adventure fantasy, science fiction, crime and Western writer who became a naturalized United States citizen in 1908.

Biography
Bedford-Jones was born in Napanee, Ontario, Canada in 1887. His family moved to the United States when he was a teenager and he eventually became a naturalized U.S. citizen. After being encouraged to try writing by his friend, writer William Wallace Cook, Bedford-Jones began writing dime novels and pulp magazine stories. Bedford-Jones was an enormously prolific writer; the pulp editor Harold Hersey once recalled meeting Bedford-Jones in Paris, where he was working on two novels simultaneously, each story on its own separate typewriter. Bedford-Jones cited Alexandre Dumas as his main influence, and wrote a sequel to Dumas' The Three Musketeers, D'Artagnan (1928). He wrote nearly 200 novels, 400 novelettes, and 800 short stories, earning the nickname "King of the Pulps". His works appeared in a number of pulp magazines. Bedford-Jones' main publisher was Blue Book magazine; he also appeared in  Adventure, All-Story Weekly, Argosy, Short Stories, Top-Notch Magazine, The Magic Carpet/Oriental Stories, Golden Fleece Historical Adventure, Ace-High Magazine, People's Story Magazine, Hutchinson's Adventure-Story Magazine,  Detective Fiction Weekly, Western Story Magazine, and Weird Tales.

Bedford-Jones wrote numerous works of historical fiction dealing with several different eras, including Ancient Rome, the Viking era, seventeenth century France and Canada during the "New France" era. Bedford-Jones produced several fantasy novels revolving around Lost Worlds, including The Temple of the Ten (1921, with W. C. Robertson).

In addition to writing fiction, Bedford-Jones also worked as a journalist for the Boston Globe, and wrote poetry. Bedford-Jones was a friend of Erle Stanley Gardner and Vincent Starrett.<ref>Vincent Starrett, Born in a bookshop; chapters from the Chicago Renascence." Norman, University of Oklahoma Press,1965.</ref>

Works
partial list
 Blood Royal (People's, 1914)
 John Solomon, Supercargo (Argosy, 1914) John Solomon #2
 Solomon's Quest (People's, 1915) John Solomon #3
 Gentleman Solomon (People's, 1915) John Solomon #4
 The Seal of John Solomon (Argosy, 1915) John Solomon #5
 Solomon's Carpet (Argosy, 1915) John Solomon #6
 The Shawl of Solomon (People's, 1917) John Solomon #9
 John Solomon, Retired (People's, 1917) John Solomon #11
 Sword Flame (All Story Weekly, 1918)
 The Ship of Shadows (Blue Book, February 1920)
 Arizona Argonauts (Short Stories, 1920)
 The Temple of the Ten (with W. C. Robertson, Adventure 1921, book form 1973)
 John Solomon (People's, 1921) John Solomon #13
 John Solomon, Incognito (People's, 1921) John Solomon #14
 Down the Coast of Barbary (Argosy, 1921)
 The Shadow (1922)
 Pirates' Gold (Adventures 1922)
 Splendour of the Gods (1924)
 The Star Woman (1924)
 The King's Passport (1925)
 D'Artagnan (Adventure, 1928)
 The Wizard of Atlas (1928)
 John Barry, New York : Creative Age Press Inc., [1947]
 The Opium Ship (2005) originally in The Thrill Book in 1919
 The House of Skulls and other Tales from the Pulps (2006)
 Blood Royal (2008) 
 Pirates' Gold (2008)
 The Golden Goshawk (2009) Captain Dan Marquad series
 The Master of Dragons (2011) O'Neill and Burkett series
 The Rajah from Hell (2012)
 The Saga of Thady Shea (2013)
 Wilderness Trail (2013) originally in Blue Book in 1915
 The Sphinx Emerald (2014)
 The Devil's Bosun (2015)
 Treasure Seekers (2015)
 Gimlet-Eye Gunn (2016)
 Our Far-Flung Battle Line (2017)
 Warriors in Exile (2017)
 They Lived by the Sword (2017)
 The Beginning of Air Mail (2018)
 Ships and Men (2019)
 Young Kit Carson (2019)
 The Second Mate (2020)

Non-fiction
 This Fiction Business (1922, revised 1929)
 The Graduate Fictioneer (1932)
 Money Brawl: How to Write for Money and This Fiction Business'' (with Jack Woodford; introduction by Richard A. Lupoff 2012)

Gallery

References

External links 

 
 
 
 
 
 Works by Henry Bedford-Jones at Project Gutenberg Australia
 A large collection of Bedford-Jones's manuscripts resides at the Harry Ransom Center at the University of Texas at Austin

1887 births
1949 deaths
20th-century American male writers
20th-century American novelists
20th-century American poets
20th-century American short story writers
20th-century Canadian male writers
20th-century Canadian novelists
20th-century Canadian poets
20th-century Canadian short story writers
American crime fiction writers
American fantasy writers
American historical novelists
American male novelists
American male short story writers
American science fiction writers
Canadian emigrants to the United States
Canadian fantasy writers
Canadian historical novelists
Canadian male novelists
Canadian male poets
Canadian male short story writers
Canadian science fiction writers
Maclean's writers and editors
Pulp fiction writers
Western (genre) writers
Writers of historical fiction set in antiquity
Writers of historical fiction set in the early modern period
Writers of historical fiction set in the Middle Ages